Sateki Tuipulotu (born 3 July 1971) is a former rugby union footballer who played internationally for Tonga.

Tuipulotu was born in Auckland, New Zealand.  He first played for Tonga in 1994 against Wales. Playing at fullback, he was a regular player for Tonga until his retirement following the 2003 Rugby World Cup. He also played in the 1995 Rugby World Cup and 1999 Rugby World Cup where he helped kick Tonga to a victory over Italy with a drop goal as the last kick of the game. His last match for Tonga was their 91–7 loss to the All Blacks at the 2003 World Cup.

He is now head coach of the Penrith Emus who compete in the Shute Shield

References
Scrum Profile

1971 births
Living people
Rugby union players from Auckland
New Zealand rugby union players
Tongan rugby union coaches
Rugby union fullbacks
Worcester Warriors players
Tonga international rugby union players
New Zealand sportspeople of Tongan descent
Leeds Rhinos players